Inheritance is a 1920 British silent drama film directed by Wilfred Noy and starring Mary Odette and Jack Hobbs.

Plot
The story has been summed up as "Squire's son weds fishergirl who saved his life, becomes dockers' leader, and weds lady he loves on wife's death".

Cast
 Mary Odette as Rachel  
 Jack Hobbs as David StMaur  
 Ursula Hughes as Peggy Falconer  
 Simeon Stuart as Sir Henry StMaur  
 D. J. Williams as Tulliver  
 F. Pope-Stamper as Walter Clifford  
 Mary Forbes as Lady Isabel

References

Bibliography
 Palmer, Scott. British Film Actors' Credits, 1895-1987. McFarland, 1998.

External links

1920 films
1920 drama films
British silent feature films
British drama films
Films directed by Wilfred Noy
British black-and-white films
1920s English-language films
1920s British films
Silent drama films